Otto Koltai is a Hungarian sprint canoer who competed in the early 1960s. He won a gold medal in the K-4 10000 m event at the 1963 ICF Canoe Sprint World Championships in Jajce.

References

Hungarian male canoeists
Year of birth missing
ICF Canoe Sprint World Championships medalists in kayak
Possibly living people